Ali Yazdani (born 1967) is an American physicist who focuses on understanding new quantum phases of matter. He is currently the Class of 1909 Professor of Physics at Princeton University and the Director of the Princeton Center for Complex Materials, a material research science and technology (MRSEC) center supported by the National Science Foundation. Together with Seamus Davis, he is the recipient of the 2023 Buckley Prize from the American Physical Society.

Yazdani specializes in the development of high-precision quantum microscopy and spectroscopy techniques to directly visualize new quantum states and their wavefunctions with atomic resolution. Among his interests are understanding novel quantum states, such as high-temperature superconductors, and topological and correlated quantum phases, including those that can harbor novel quasi-particles such as Majorana zero modes. He and his research group have developed several new quantum microscopy techniques and instrumentation and operated them in specialized ultra-quiet laboratories at Princeton.

Biography 
Yazdani was born in 1967 and raised in Tehran, Iran, prior to immigrating to California, USA. He received his BA in Physics with high honors from UC Berkeley in 1989, and his Ph.D. in Applied Physics from Stanford University. After a postdoctoral research work with Don Eigler at IBM he went on to be an assistant, associate and then full professor at University of Illinois Urbana-Champaign.

He moved to Princeton as a professor in 2005 and was named Class of 1909 professor of physics in 2015. He has held visiting positions at Stanford, University of Cambridge, UK (Fellow Commoner at Trinity College, 2019–20) and has been Morris Loeb Lectures at Harvard University in 2018.

Notable awards and honors 
 Buckley Prize (2023)
 Member of the National Academy of Sciences (2019).
 Fellow of American Academy of Arts and Sciences (2015), of the American Association for the Advancement of Science (2012) and of the American Physical Society (2009).
 Gordon and Betty Moore Foundation Experimental Investigator since 2008.
 Humboldt Research Award (2014)

References 

1967 births
Living people
American physicists
Members of the United States National Academy of Sciences
Fellows of the American Academy of Arts and Sciences
Fellows of the American Association for the Advancement of Science
Fellows of the American Physical Society
Humboldt Research Award recipients
University of California, Irvine alumni
Stanford University alumni
University of Illinois Urbana-Champaign faculty
Princeton University faculty